Nelson Suárez (born 7 October 1956) is an Ecuadorian diver. He competed in the men's 10 metre platform event at the 1976 Summer Olympics.

References

1956 births
Living people
Ecuadorian male divers
Olympic divers of Ecuador
Divers at the 1976 Summer Olympics
Place of birth missing (living people)